These are the late night schedules for the four United States broadcast networks that offer programming during this time period, from September 2015 to August 2016. All times are Eastern or Pacific. Affiliates will fill non-network schedule with local, syndicated, or paid programming. Affiliates also have the option to preempt or delay network programming at their discretion.

Legend

Schedule

Monday-Friday

Saturday

By network

ABC

Returning series
ABC World News Now
Jimmy Kimmel Live!
Nightline

CBS

Returning series
The Late Late Show with James Corden

New series
CBS Overnight News
The Late Show with Stephen Colbert

Not returning from 2014-15:
CBS Summer Showcase
Late Show with David Letterman
The Late Late Show with Craig Ferguson
Up to the Minute

FOX

Returning series
Encore Programming
Home Free 
Sunday Sitcom Series

New series
Party Over Here

NBC

Returning series
Last Call with Carson Daly
Late Night with Seth Meyers
Mad Money 
Saturday Night Live
Today With Kathie Lee and Hoda 
The Tonight Show Starring Jimmy Fallon

References

United States late night network television schedules
Late
Late